The Roman Catholic Church in Cuba comprises three ecclesiastical provinces each headed by an archbishop. The provinces are in turn subdivided into 9 dioceses and 3 archdiocese each headed by a bishop or an archbishop.

List of Dioceses

Ecclesiastical province of San Cristobal de la Habana 
 Archdiocese of San Cristobal de la Habana
 Diocese of Matanzas
 Diocese of Pinar del Rio

Ecclesiastical province of Santiago de Cuba 
 Archdiocese of Santiago de Cuba
 Diocese of Guantánamo-Baracoa
 Diocese of Holguín
 Diocese of Santisimo Salvador de Bayamo y Manzanillo

Ecclesiastical province of Camagüey 
 Archdiocese of Camagüey
 Diocese of Ciego de Avila
 Diocese of Cienfuegos
 Diocese of Santa Clara

References
Catholic-Hierarchy entry.
GCatholic.org.

Cuba
Catholic dioceses